Aziz Yıldırım (born 2 November 1952) was the 36th chairman of the Turkish multi-sport club Fenerbahçe SK. He lost the election held on 3 June 2018 to Ali Koç which made him the 37th president of the Turkish club. He served the club as the president from 1998 to 2018. He has a degree in civil engineering.

Club's honours

Football 
UEFA Champions League : 2007–08 (quarter-final)
UEFA Europa League : 2012–13 (semi-final)
Turkish Süper Lig (6) : 2000–01, 2003–04, 2004–05, 2006–07, 2010–11, 2013–14
Türkiye Kupası (2): 2011-2012, 2012-2013
Süper Kupa (3): 2007, 2009, 2014
Başbakanlık Kupası (1) : 1998
Atatürk Kupası (1) : 1998

Men's basketball 
EuroLeague (1): 2016–17, 2015–16 (runner-up), 2017–18 (runner-up), 2014–15 (Fourth)
TBL (7): 2006–07, 2007–08, 2009–10, 2010–11, 2013–14, 2015–16, 2016–17
Türkiye Kupası (4): 2009–10, 2010–11, 2012–13, 2015–16
Cumhurbaşkanlığı Kupası (4): 2006–07, 2012–13, 2015–16, 2016–17

Women's basketball 
EuroLeague Women: 2012–13 (runner-up), 2013–14 (runner-up), 2016–17 (runner-up), 2015–16 (Third), 2011–12 (Fourth), 2014–15 (Fourth)
TKBL (13): 1998–99, 2001–02, 2003–04, 2005–06, 2006–07, 2007–08, 2008–09, 2009–10, 2010–11, 2011–12, 2012–13, 2015–16, 2017–18
Türkiye Kupası (11): 1998–99, 1999–00, 2000–01, 2003–04, 2004–05, 2005–06, 2006–07, 2007–08, 2008–09, 2014–15, 2015–16
Cumhurbaşkanlığı Kupası (11): 1998–99, 1999–00, 2000–01, 2003–04, 2004–05, 2006–07, 2009–10, 2011–12, 2012–13, 2013–14, 2014–15

Men's volleyball 
CEV Challenge Cup (1) : 2013–14
BVA Kupası (2): 2009–10, 2013–14
Voleybol Ligi (4): 2007–08, 2009–10, 2010–11, 2011–12 
Türkiye Kupası (3): 2007–08, 2011–12, 2016–17
Voleybol Süper Kupa (3): 2011, 2012, 2017

Women's volleyball 
FIVB Volleyball Women's Club World Championship (1): 2010, 2012 (Third)
Women's CEV Champions League (1): 2011–12, 2009–10 (runner-up), 2015–16, 2010–11 (Third)
Women's CEV Cup (1): 2013–14, 2012–13 (runner-up), 2008–09 (Third)
Voleybol Ligi (5): 2008–09, 2009–10, 2010–11, 2014–15, 2016–17
Türkiye Kupası (3): 2009–10, 2014–15, 2016–17
Voleybol Süper Kupa (3): 2009, 2010, 2015

Athletics 
Avrupa Kulüpler Şampiyonası (men's) (1): 1998, 2006 (runner-up) 
Avrupa Kulüpler Şampiyonası (women's): 1998 (runner-up)

Boxing 
Avrupa Kulüpler Şampiyonası: 1999 (runner-up)

Swimming 
CIJ Meet Kupası (2): 2004, 2005

Table Tennis 
ETTU Champions League (1) : 2014–15, 2013–14 (runner-up)
ETTU Kupası (2): 2011–12, 2012–13, 2007–08 (runner-up)

Personal life
Yıldırım was born in Ergani. He has 3 daughters, two of whom are from his first marriage.

2011 Turkish sports corruption scandal

On 2 July 2012, a Turkish "Special Authority Court" sentenced Yıldırım to three years and nine months for match-fixing and two years and six months for forming an illegal organisation. The sentence was later approved by the Turkish Supreme Court of Appeals. He was detained for one year in Metris Prison together with several other sportspeople involved in the scandal. However, on 6 March 2014 special authority courts were abolished in Turkey. On 23 July 2014, his earlier retrial demand was accepted, meaning that he and all the people involved will have a retrial about this case. The first trial of the retrial process was made on 24 April 2015. On 9 October 2015, the courts acquitted Aziz Yıldırım and all the people who were charged at the beginning of the investigation, pending the Supreme Court's approval. Fenerbahce declared that after the Supreme Court's approval, they would take every action to be compensated from all of the damages that has been done to the club by this investigation and previous court rulings. In June 2018 Yildirim faced fierce competition in his bid to be reelected president of Fenerbahce, a role he had held since 1998. He lost to Ali Koc.

References

External links

1952 births
Living people
People from Ergani
Turkish civil engineers
Fenerbahçe S.K. presidents
Fenerbahçe S.K. board members
Diyarbakırspor footballers
Turkish businesspeople
Association footballers not categorized by position
Turkish footballers